Syntrichopappus fremontii (Frémont's-gold, yellowray Frémont's-gold false woolly daisy, or Frémont's xerasid), is a small annual plant in the family(Asteraceae. It has yellow flower heads and grows in the Mojave Desert, to Utah and northwestern Arizona.

Distribution and habitat
It is distributed throughout the Mojave Desert, the southwest Sonoran Desert, and parts of northwestern Arizona, southwestern Utah and northern Baja California.

Description

Growth pattern
It somewhat resembles Eriophyllum wallacei, but grows on higher ground and has only about half the number of ray flowers.

Leaves and stems

Inflorescence and fruit
It flowers from March or April to June. The inflorescence has 5 hardened phyllaries surrounding a head of 5 yellow ray flowers with several yellow disk flowers. The ray flowers have 3 strong lobes, or teeth.

Ecology

References

Madieae